Anthospermeae is a tribe of flowering plants in the family Rubiaceae and contains 208 species in 12 genera. Its representatives are found in the Southern Hemisphere, with the exception of the two species of the genus Phyllis. At least two genera, namely Coprosma and Galopina are anemophilous.

Genera 
Currently accepted names

 Anthospermum L. (39 sp)
 Carpacoce Sond. (7 sp)
 Coprosma J.R.Forst. & G.Forst. (110 sp)
 Durringtonia R.J.F.Hend. & Guymer (1 sp)
 Galopina Thunb. (4 sp)
 Leptostigma Arn. (7 sp)
 Nenax Gaertn. (9 sp)
 Nertera Banks ex Sol. (10 sp)
 Normandia Hook.f. (1 sp)
 Opercularia Gaertn. (17 sp)
 Phyllis L. (2 sp)
 Pomax Sol. ex DC. (1 sp)

Synonyms

 Ambraria Cruse = Nenax
 Ambraria Heist. ex Fabr. = Anthospermum
 Bupleuroides Moench = Phyllis
 Caprosma G.Don = Coprosma
 Corynula Hook.f. = Leptostigma
 Cryptospermum Young = Opercularia
 Cunina C.Gay = Nertera
 Erythrodanum Thouars = Nertera
 Eurynome DC. = Coprosma
 Gomozia Mutis ex L.f. = Nertera
 Lagotis E.Mey. = Carpacoce
 Marquisia A.Rich. ex DC. = Coprosma
 Nobula Adans. = Phyllis
 Oxyspermum Eckl. & Zeyh. = Galopina
 Pelaphia Banks & Sol. ex A.Cunn. = Coprosma
 Peratanthe Urb. = Nertera
 Rubioides Sol. ex Gaertn. = Opercularia

References 

Rubioideae tribes